Neuzeit S is a sans-serif typeface designed by Arthur Ritzel in 1959 (as Neuzeit-Buch) and 1966 (as Neuzeit-Buch S) for Linotype and a corporate typeface for Siemens. The German name translates to English as "new time" and refers to the modern era. The face combines characteristics of both geometric and neo-grotesque sans-serif classifications, and is based on Neuzeit Grotesk, a more purely geometric sans-serif designed by Wilhelm Pischner in 1928 for the Stempel Type Foundry.

Neuzeit S is distinct for its contrast of wide circular characters o, O, p, q, and Q with the more compact characters h, n, u, and t.
Fox News Channel uses this typeface as one of its lower third typefaces.

References

External links
Adobe web page for Neuzeit S
MyFonts, Neuzeit S
Neuzeit Office (redesign intended to work better in body text)
Fonts In Use profile for Neuzeit S

Stempel typefaces
Linotype typefaces
Geometric sans-serif typefaces
Grotesque sans-serif typefaces